Adesmus fortunei is a species of beetle in the family Cerambycidae. It was described by Lingafelter in 2013.

References

Adesmus
Beetles described in 2013